Soulsville is the ninth studio album from Huey Lewis and the News and the band's first since Plan B in 2001. The album was released on October 18, 2010, in the United Kingdom and Europe and November 2, 2010, in the United States. The album, a tribute to the artists and music of Stax Records, was the brainchild of the band's manager, Bob Brown. As lead singer Huey Lewis explained, "the public isn't clamoring for new Huey Lewis & the News material". Brown and the band decided "it would be cooler to go into the [Stax] catalog a little deeper and find songs that people hadn't heard and capture them faithfully". This album features new guitarists Stef Burns and Bill Hinds and baritone saxophonist Johnnie Bamont, replacing Chris Hayes and the late Ron Stallings.

Recording
Lewis and the News recorded Soulsville at Ardent Studios in Memphis, Tennessee, in early 2010. One of the original Stax co-engineers, Jim Gaines, who also engineered the band's best-selling albums, Sports and Fore!, produced the album with the band.

Reception

Stephen Thomas Erlewine of AllMusic writes, "what makes the album successful is that Huey Lewis & the News don't choose the obvious tunes", citing that their love for the music is infectious and the album "winds up like a bunch of old friends having fun revisiting their favorite tunes." Rick Moore of American Songwriter also praises the selection of "songs that are a little more obscure", calling it "a solid collection of 14 tunes from the Stax/Volt heyday" and a nice homage by the News. J. Matthew Cobb of SoulTracks thinks the song selections are a perfect fit for Lewis's voice and show how rich and vast the Stax catalog is, calling the album "one of the most aesthetically sound cover albums of 2010". Jason Heller of The A.V. Club completely disagrees by claiming Soulsville doesn't have soul and only a few of the songs rise "above the level of really good karaoke." He rips Lewis' renditions of Solomon Burke's (who died shortly before the album was released) "Got to Get You Off My Mind" and "Cry to Me", describing it as "a pathetic epitaph for the late King of Rock & Soul."

Track listing

Album cover
The album cover was designed by Memphis folk artist Lamar Sorrento. It presents a caricature of a Memphis street corner, complete with musicians, rib joints, and WDIA, the country's first black radio station.

Chart performance

Personnel

Huey Lewis and the News
 Huey Lewis – lead vocals, harmonica
 Stef Burns – guitar (1, 4, 10, 12)
 Bill Hinds – guitar (2-11, 13, 14)
 Johnny Colla – tenor saxophone, percussion, backing vocals, arrangements
 John Pierce – bass
 Bill Gibson – drums, percussion, backing vocals
 Sean Hopper – keyboards

The Sports Section
 Marvin McFadden – trumpet
 Rob Sudduth – tenor saxophone
 Johnnie Bamont – alto saxophone, baritone saxophone, flute

Additional musicians
 Rick Steff – acoustic piano (1, 12)
 John Gove – trombone (2, 4)
Additional vocalists
 Bertram Brown – backing vocals (1, 2, 9, 12, 13)
 Jackie Johnson – backing vocals (1-4, 9, 12, 13)
 Reba Russell – backing vocals (1-4, 9, 12, 13)
 Daunielle "Pie" Hill – backing vocals (3, 4)
 Dorothy Combs Morrison – vocal duet (4)
 Larry Batiste – backing vocals (5, 7, 11)
 Bryan Dyer – backing vocals (5, 10)
 Niko Ellison – backing vocals (5, 7, 10, 11)
 Claytoven Richardson – backing vocals (5, 7, 10, 11)
 Ashling Cole – backing vocals (8)
 Sandy Griffith – backing vocals (8)

Production
 Huey Lewis and the News – producer
 Jim Gaines – producer, engineer, mixing 
 Bob Brown – executive producer, manager 
 Curry Weber – engineer, remixes 
 Vadim Canby – additional engineer
 Johnny Colla – additional engineer, musical arrangements and director
 Lydia Gilman – assistant engineer 
 Lamar Sorrento – cover art
 Neko Studios – graphic design 
 Huey Lewis – liner notes 
Studios
 Recorded at Ardent Studios (Memphis, Tennessee).
 Additional recording at Way Out West Recording (San Rafael, California) and Morningside Studios (San Anselmo, California).
 Mastered at L. Nix Mastering (Memphis, Tennessee).

References

External links

2010 albums
Huey Lewis and the News albums
Soul albums by American artists
Tribute albums